Boyd Head is a headland close east of the mouth of Vane Glacier on the coast of Marie Byrd Land, Antarctica. It was mapped by the United States Geological Survey from surveys and from U.S. Navy air photos, 1959–66, and named by the Advisory Committee on Antarctic Names for Captain Hugh F. Boyd III, USA, Construction Projects Officer during Operation Deep Freeze 1972 and 1973.

References
 

Headlands of Marie Byrd Land